John Drost (born 27 February 1958) is a Dutch bobsledder. He competed in the two man event at the 1984 Winter Olympics.

References

1958 births
Living people
Dutch male bobsledders
Olympic bobsledders of the Netherlands
Bobsledders at the 1984 Winter Olympics
Sportspeople from Utrecht (city)